Myrina subornata, the West African fig-tree blue or small fig blue, is a butterfly in the family Lycaenidae. It is found in Senegal, Guinea-Bissau, Burkina Faso, Guinea, Ghana, Nigeria, Cameroon, the Republic of the Congo, Uganda, Sudan and possibly Kenya. The habitat consists of savanna.

Adults suck the juices of small fermenting fruits.

The larvae feed on Ficus species. The larvae are tended by the ant species Pheidole rotundata.

Subspecies
 Myrina subornata subornata (eastern Senegal, Guinea-Bissau, Burkina Faso, Guinea, northern Ghana, central and northern Nigeria, northern Cameroon, Congo, Uganda)
 Myrina subornata kacheleba d'Abrera, 1980 (Kenya: west to Kacheleba and the Suk Mountains)
 Myrina subornata nuba Talbot, 1935 (Sudan)

References

External links
Die Gross-Schmetterlinge der Erde 13: Die Afrikanischen Tagfalter. Plate XIII 66 f

Butterflies described in 1903
Amblypodiini
Butterflies of Africa